The IOF .315 sporting rifle is a civilian version of the British military Lee–Enfield rifle, chambered in the 8×50mmR Mannlicher cartridge rather than the .303 British military cartridge due to Indian gun control laws.

The rifle is manufactured at Ordnance Factory Tiruchirappalli  which manufactured Lee–Enfield rifles for the British colonial Indian Army and post-independence Indian forces. It's also made in Rifle Factory Ishapore.

It has a box-type magazine which holds 5 rounds and uses an 8 mm cartridge based on the 8x50mmR Mannlicher, but is loaded with hunting-type bullets rather than military ones.

References

Bolt-action rifles of India